Jenny is an American sitcom that aired on NBC from September 28, 1997 to January 12, 1998. The series was intended to be a star vehicle for Jenny McCarthy.

Synopsis
The series starred McCarthy as Jenny McMillan, a Utica convenience store clerk who suddenly inherits a vast fortune from the B movie star father (George Hamilton) she never knew (who appears on TV in movies and commercials he appeared in). After her father's funeral, Jenny and her lifelong friend Maggie (Heather Paige Kent) decide to pursue fame in Hollywood.

Cast
 Jenny McCarthy as Jenny McMillan
 Heather Paige Kent  as Maggie Marino
 George Hamilton as Guy Hathaway
 Dale Godboldo as Cooper
 Rafer Weigel as Max
 Carolyn Hennesy as Chase Gardner

Cancellation
The series, originally scheduled on Sundays opposite the second half of CBS's Top 5 hit Touched by an Angel, Fox's Top 15 hit King of the Hill, and the last half-hour of ABC's Top 40 hit The Wonderful World of Disney, was moved to Monday nights in December 1997 in an attempt to gain more viewers. The move failed to attract more viewers and Jenny was canceled after 10 of the 17 episodes produced were aired. After the first 10 shows aired Paramount Television continued production in anticipation of the series being picked up by UPN, but the show was not picked up by the network. In an episode seen only outside the United States, Guy turned out not to be dead only missing.

Episodes

References

External links
 

1997 American television series debuts
1998 American television series endings
1990s American sitcoms
NBC original programming
English-language television shows
Television shows set in Los Angeles
Television series by CBS Studios
McCarthy family